YY is a major Chinese video-based social network, a subsidiary of JOYY. It has over 300 million users. It features a virtual currency which users earn through activities such as karaoke or creating tutorial videos and which is later converted to real cash. Launched in 2005 as duowan.com, it originally targeted gamers, before broadening to include video streaming and chat features for uses such as concerts, fashion and sports. Users exchange "virtual roses" as a form of currency, with top users said to earn as much as $20,000 per month. In November 2012, YY was listed on the NASDAQ.

The website was originally known as YY Voice. On 24 November 2014, YY's video streaming service began operating independently as Huya Live.

On 18 November 2020, MuddyWatersResearch released a report claiming fraud in the financial and public reporting of JOYY Inc.  leading to a significant decrease in the value of its shares.

References

External links 
 
 VoaNews: The Largest Social Network You've Never Heard Of
 Forbes: YY.com, China's Unique Real-Time Voice and Video Service with a Virtual Goods Twist
 New York Times: Lucrative Stardom in China Using a Webcam and a Voice
 NPR: YY Changes Its Tune After Karaoke Is A Hit

Chinese social networking websites
Video hosting
Internet properties established in 2005
2005 establishments in China
Chinese brands
Chinese entertainment websites
Video game streaming services
Companies listed on the Nasdaq